Bimar may refer to:
Bimad, Iran
Baymargh, Iran